Då & nu is a compilation album by Swedish dansband Arvingarna, released in 1996.

Track listing
En 68:a cabriolet
Nattens sista spårvagn
Varför blir det inte alltid som man vill
Tänk om jag hade ett flygplan
Glasslåten
Sången till Jennifer
Natt efter natt
Granna Anna
Linda går
Eloise
Coola killar
Räck mig din hand
Jeannie
Bo Diddley
Det borde vara jag
Månsken över heden
...och hon sa
Du och jag
Tjejer
Angelina
Än finns det kärlek

Charts

References

1996 albums
Arvingarna albums